The 1953 Los Angeles Rams season was the team's 16th year with the National Football League and the eighth season in Los Angeles.

Schedule

Standings

References

Los Angeles Rams
Los Angeles Rams seasons
Los Angeles